Tri Peaks is, after Sandstone Peak, one of the highest points in the Santa Monica Mountains with an elevation of .

See also 
 Santa Monica Mountains
 Santa Monica Mountains National Recreation Area
 Backbone Trail

References 

Santa Monica Mountains
Mountains of Ventura County, California
Santa Monica Mountains National Recreation Area
Mountains of Southern California